Legend of the Seven Dreams is an album by Norwegian saxophonist Jan Garbarek, that features Rainer Brüninghaus, Eberhard Weber and Naná Vasconcelos. It was released on the ECM label in 1988.

Reception 
Allmusic awarded the album with 2.5 stars and its review by Mark W. B. Allender states: "The disc opens with "He Came From the North," which features a melody based on a traditional Lapp joik from the artist's native Norway and progresses into a longer section with an interplay that is both sparse and rhythmic. The sax line here is astonishingly beautiful".

Track listing 
All compositions by Jan Garbarek.

"He Comes from the North (Introduction based on the Lapp joik; Áillohaš)" – 13:37
"Aichuri, the Song Man" – 5:03
"Tongue of Secrets“ – 8:12
"Brother Wind" – 8:07
"Its Name Is Secret Road" – 1:48
"Send Word" – 7:19
"Voy Cantando" – 6:55 
"Mirror Stone 1" – 1:15
"Mirror Stone 2" – 2:29

Personnel 
 Jan Garbarek – soprano and tenor saxophones, flute
 Rainer Brüninghaus – electronic keyboards 
 Eberhard Weber – bass
 Naná Vasconcelos – percussion, voice

References 

1988 albums
ECM Records albums
Jan Garbarek albums
Albums produced by Manfred Eicher